Joseph Horace "Bud" Stotler (June 26, 1888 – October 14, 1957) was an American Thoroughbred horse racing Champion trainer who conditioned horses that won four Championships. He was of German descent.

Commonly known as "Bud," he began working in the horse racing business in his native Pennsylvania where he first conditioned horses for a stable owner from his hometown of Salisbury. He eventually moved to compete on the Maryland circuit which at the time was a major player in Thoroughbred racing offering some of the best purses at a number of high-profile racetracks such as Pimlico Race Course, Bowie Race Track, Laurel Park and the Timonium Racetrack.

During his career, Bud Stotler trained for major owners such as for Sagamore Farm and beginning in 1932, simultaneously for the Shoshone Stable  of William R. Coe. For Coe, Stotler conditioned the 1932 American Champion Two-Year-Old Colt, Ladysman. In the last few years of his career he trained for Charles Howard, owner of Seabiscuit.

Of his four starters in the Kentucky Derby Stotler's best finish was second in 1934 with Discovery and from seven starters in the Preakness Stakes his best was a second with Ladysman in 1933.

The Sagamore Farm years
Sagamore Farm was a Glyndon, Maryland breeding farm with full training facilities. Hired in 1925, the operation was owned by Margaret Emerson, heiress to the Bromo-Seltzer fortune and widow of the also wealthy Alfred Gwynne Vanderbilt who lost his life when the RMS Lusitania was sunk by a German U-boat on May 7, 1915. In 1933, she gave the farm and racing stable to her son Alfred Jr. and Stotler remained as the Sagamore Farm manager and trainer.

Bud Stotler would earn national championship honors in 1935, winning 37 stakes races and earning more purse money than any trainer in the United States. The star of the Sagamore stable, and the horse for which Stotler is best remembered, was the 1935 American Horse of the Year and 1935 and 1936 American Champion Older Male Horse and U.S. Racing Hall of Fame inductee, Discovery. In 1939, Bud Stotler conditioned that year's American Champion Two-Year-Old Filly Now What even though a serious automobile accident in April 1939 forced him to temporarily hand over his Sagamore training duties to assistant, Lee McCoy. In December 1939, Stotler announced his retirement  and resigned from Sagamore  but returned later in 1940 to train a small stable of horses for himself and other clients until 1944 when he signed with the major California operation of Charles Howard.

Following his retirement from racing, Stotler lived out his years in Baltimore, Maryland, not far from Pimlico Race Course. He was a close friend of orchestra leader Ben Bernie and made frequent appearances  on his radio broadcasts.

Joseph and Ada Stotler's daughter, Katherine, married jockey John Bejshak.

References

1888 births
1957 deaths
American horse trainers
People from Somerset County, Pennsylvania
American people of German descent